"Live Your Life Be Free" is a song written by Rick Nowels and Ellen Shipley, produced by Nowels for Belinda Carlisle's fourth album Live Your Life Be Free. Released on September 16, 1991, the single reached the top 20 in Australia, Sweden, and the United Kingdom. The song's music video was directed by Nick Egan.

Track listings
7-inch and cassette single
 "Live Your Life Be Free"
 "Loneliness Game"

12-inch single
A1. "Live Your Life Be Free" (club mix) – 5:30
B1. "Live Your Life Be Free" – 4:20
B2. "Loneliness Game" – 4:31

CD single
 "Live Your Life Be Free"
 "Loneliness Game"
 "Live Your Life Be Free" (club mix)

Charts

Weekly charts

Year-end charts

References

1991 singles
1991 songs
Belinda Carlisle songs
Song recordings produced by Rick Nowels
Songs written by Ellen Shipley
Songs written by Rick Nowels
Virgin Records singles